Blame It on Me may refer to:

 Blame It on Me (album), 1997 album by Alana Davis
 "Blame It on Me" (Chrisette Michele song), 2009
 "Blame It on Me" (D:Ream song), 1994
 "Blame It on Me" (George Ezra song), 2014
 "Blame It on Me", a song by Barenaked Ladies from Gordon

See also
 "Sorry, Blame It on Me", 2007 song by Akon
 "Blame It on the Weatherman", 1999 song by B*Witched